The 2nd constituency of Maine-et-Loire (French: Deuxième circonscription de Maine-et-Loire) is a French legislative constituency in the Maine-et-Loire département. Like the other 576 French constituencies, it elects one MP using a two round electoral system.

Description
The 2nd Constituency of Maine-et-Loire covers the centre of the department including some southern parts of Angers.

For many years the seat had been held by deputies from the centre-right, before being claimed by the Socialist Party in 2007. At the 2017 election the constituency was won by Stella Dupont a former PS regional councillor, pushing her former party to 7th place and just over 3% of the vote.

Assembly members

Election results

2022

 
 
 
 
 
 
 
|-
| colspan="8" bgcolor="#E9E9E9"|
|-

2017

 
 
 
 
 
 
 
 
 
 
|-
| colspan="8" bgcolor="#E9E9E9"|
|-

2012

 
 
 
 
 
 
|-
| colspan="8" bgcolor="#E9E9E9"|
|-

References

2